Borgharen is a town in the Dutch province of Limburg. It is a part of the municipality of Maastricht, and lies about 3 km north of Maastricht. Until 1970, it was a separate municipality.

In 2001, Borgharen had 1814 inhabitants. The built-up area of the town was 0.34 km², and contained 732 residences.

People from Borgharen 
 Paul Panhuysen (1934–2015), composer
 Johan de Vree (1938-2017), Dutch political scientist

References

External links
 

Former municipalities of Limburg (Netherlands)
Populated places in Limburg (Netherlands)
Neighbourhoods of Maastricht